The winter of 1880-81 in the United States, referred to as the Hard Winter, the Long Winter or the Snow Winter, was a period of extreme cold and large snowfalls across the central Great Plains region. The winter is depicted in the 1940 novel The Long Winter by Laura Ingalls Wilder and other fictional works.

The Hard Winter began on October 15, 1880, with a blizzard in eastern South Dakota and lasted until April 1881. Some railroads in the region were covered with so much snow that it could not be cleared and trains could not pass, cutting off towns from critical supplies.

An abrupt spring thaw followed the Hard Winter, and flooding along the Mississippi and Missouri rivers caused more hardship. Many towns were damaged, and some were abandoned after the flooding. A flood in Omaha permanently changed the course of the Missouri River.

The Long Winter by Laura Ingalls Wilder is a fictionalized account of the Hard Winter, which Wilder lived through when she was a teenager. She describes how the winter affected her family and fellow settlers, forcing them to ration food and fuel. The weather details in the book have been corroborated by meteorological records and other historical accounts of the winter

References 

Winter weather events in the United States